Tamang Selo (Nepali: तामाङ सेलो) is a genre of Nepali folk song sung by the Tamang people of Nepal and is widely popular among the Nepali-speaking community in Nepal, in India, and around the world. It is usually accompanied by the Tamang instruments: Damphu, Madal and Tungna. A Selo could be very catchy and lively or slow and melodious and is usually sung to express love, sorrow and stories of day to day life.

Hira Devi Waiba, pioneer of Nepali folk songs and Tamang Selo 

Hira Devi Waiba is hailed as the pioneer of Nepali folk songs and Tamang Selo. Her song "Chura ta Hoina Astura" (Nepali: चुरा त होइन अस्तुरा) is said to be the first Tamang Selo ever recorded. Waiba has sung nearly 300 songs in a career spanning 40 years. Waiba's children Navneet Aditya Waiba and Satya Aditya Waiba have carried the legacy further by continuing on her footsteps. Navneet and Satya are the only individuals in the Nepali folk music genre who produce authentic traditional Nepali folk songs without adulteration or modernisation.

See also 

Hira Devi Waiba
Navneet Aditya Waiba
Tamang people
Music of Nepal
Ethnic groups of Nepal

References

Nepalese folk music
Folk music genres
Tamang people